Say You Will may refer to:

Say You Will (album), a 2003 album by Fleetwood Mac
"Say You Will" (Fleetwood Mac song)
"Say You Will" (Foreigner song), 1987
"Say You Will" (Kanye West song), 2008
"Say You Will", a 2014 song by Billy Gilman
"Say You Will", a 1980 song by Blanket of Secrecy
"Say You Will", a 2004 song by Brandy from Afrodisiac
"Say You Will", a 1977 song by Eddie Henderson
"Say You Will", a 1963 song by Jackie Wilson
"Say You Will", a 2020 song by Kygo from Golden Hour
"Say You Will", a 1987 song by Mick Jagger
"Say You Will", a 1988 song by Starpoint
Say You Will (film), a 2017 film starring Travis Tope